Gone to the Mountain (Spanish:Tirarse al monte) is a 1974 Spanish drama film directed by Alfonso Ungría and starring Julieta Serrano, Yelena Samarina and José Renovales.

Cast
 Julieta Serrano 
 Yelena Samarina 
 José Renovales 
 Luis Ciges 
 Francisco Llinás
 Andrés Mejuto
 Carlos Otero as Guardia  
 Mario Gas
 Maxi Martín 
 Ricardo Lucía 
 José Vidal 
 Manuel Pereiro 
 María Reniu as Chica del cementerio  
 Carlos Vasallo 
 Luis Alonso
 Danièle Juving as Conchita

References

Bibliography
 Bentley, Bernard. A Companion to Spanish Cinema. Boydell & Brewer 2008.

External links 

1974 films
Spanish drama films
1974 drama films
1970s Spanish-language films
Films directed by Alfonso Ungría
Films scored by Carmelo Bernaola
1970s Spanish films